DH.2 or DH-2 or DH 2 may refer to:
Airco DH.2, a British 1910s biplane fighter
Häfeli DH-2, a Swiss 1910s reconnaissance biplane
Die Hard 2, 1990 film starring Bruce Willis
Harry Potter and the Deathly Hallows – Part 2, a 2011 film